Barış Ataş (born 1 February 1987) is a Turkish professional footballer who currently plays for Diyarbakır BB.

Life and career
Ataş was born in Kulp, Diyarbakır. He began his footballing career as a thirteen-year-old with Balıkspor. He was transferred to Diyarbakırspor in 2002, making his professional league debut on 4 February 2006. He scored 6 goals in 96 appearances in the A2 league.

Ataş signed a 3+1 contract with Trabzonspor on 22 June 2010.

Honours
Trabzonspor
Turkish Super Cup: 2010

References

External links

1987 births
Living people
People from Kulp, Turkey
Turkish footballers
Turkey under-21 international footballers
Turkey youth international footballers
Süper Lig players
Trabzonspor footballers
Mersin İdman Yurdu footballers
Association football midfielders
Kurdish sportspeople
TFF First League players